The 2006 Karl Schäfer Memorial (also known as the Vienna Cup) took place from October 11 through 14th, 2006. Skaters competed in the disciplines of men's singles, ladies' singles, and ice dancing.

Results

Men

Ladies

Ice dancing

External links
 results

Karl Schäfer Memorial
Karl Schafer Memorial, 2006
Karl Schafer Memorial